Cryptocephalus leucomelas is a species of case-bearing leaf beetle in the family Chrysomelidae. It is found in North America (the United States and Canada). It measures  in length.

Subspecies
These three subspecies belong to the species Cryptocephalus leucomelas:
 Cryptocephalus leucomelas leucomelas Suffrian, 1852
 Cryptocephalus leucomelas trisignatus R. White, 1968
 Cryptocephalus leucomelas vitticollis J. L. LeConte, 1880

References

Further reading

 
 

leucomelas
Beetles of North America
Beetles described in 1852
Taxa named by Christian Wilhelm Ludwig Eduard Suffrian
Articles created by Qbugbot